Capitán Oriel Lea Plaza Airport  is an airport serving Tarija, the capital of the Tarija Department of Bolivia. The airport is in the southeastern section of the city, which is within a basin of the Cordillera Central mountain range. There is distant mountainous terrain in all quadrants.

The Tarija non-directional beacon (Ident: TJA) and VOR-DME (Ident: TAR) are located on the field.

The runway length includes a  displaced threshold on Runway 31.

Airlines and destinations

See also
Transport in Bolivia
List of airports in Bolivia

References

External links
Tarija Airport at OpenStreetMap
Capitan Oriel Lea Plaza Airport at OurAirports

Capitan Oriel Lea Plaza Airport at FallingRain

Airports in Tarija Department
Tarija